Agim Ramadani (3 May 1963 – 11 April 1999) also known with nickname "KATANA", was an Albanian commander of the Kosovo Liberation Army (KLA), an ethnic Albanian paramilitary organization that sought the independence of Kosovo from Serbia. He was killed in action during the Battle of Košare. After the war, he was declared Hero of Kosovo.

Biography
Agim Ramadani was born on 3 May 1963 in the village of Žegra located in the Karadak Highlands in the municipality of Gnjilane in AP Kosovo. His Family originally hails from Depce near Preševo. He studied at the higher technical school in Gnjilane in 1980, and the Military Academy for communications in Zagreb, SR Croatia. Poetry and painting were his passions during high school. His poetry was published in literary magazines, whereas painting exhibitions were organized in Croatia, where he worked as a JNA officer, and in Switzerland, where lived after the Croatian War broke out. In 1998 Ramadani accepted honorary membership at the European Academy of Arts.

In 1998, Ramadani left Switzerland, where his wife and three children (two sons and a daughter) lived, and joined the Kosovo Liberation Army (KLA). He died at the Battle of Košare.

Kosovo War 
With the Outbreak of the Kosovo War, Ramadani joined the Kosovo Liberation Army, where he immediately became a commander in the Operational Zone of Dukagjin. His first Military action happened on 9 August 1998 in the village of Oplazë (Serbian: Опляз, romanized: Opljaz), where he successfully defeated the Yugoslav forces killing 17-20 Yugoslav Soldiers aswell as 2 Yugoslav Army officers. His next Operation against Yugoslav forces happened on a Yugoslav Military Outpost and Watchtower near the Đeravica Mountain on 15 September 1998. Again the Yugoslav forces suffered a heavy defeat, with one of the heaviest Death tolls during the War at that time. Agim Ramadanis Attack left 40 Yugoslav Soldiers dead and 20 wounded. In his next Operation codenamed "Operation Fenix" on 30 September 1998 he attacked Yugoslav Army positions near the Košare Military Base. Again the Operation ended with an victory for Ramadani's brigade, killing 6 Yugoslav soldiers, wounding another 6, destroying 1 Tank and 1 APC. On 9 April 1999 Ramadani, together with 136 Soldiers under his command crossed the Albanian-Yugoslav border near Košare and attacked Yugoslav Forces numbering 300 Soldiers, starting the bloodiest Battle in the entire Kosovo War. The fighting on the first day lasted 24 hours and ended with a victory for Ramadani's forces, forcing the Yugoslav soldiers to retreat to the Košare base, the heavy fighting left 4 KLA soldiers and 23 Yugoslav soldiers dead. His forces then continued to capture Rrasa e Koshares and Maja Glava, from which they bombarded the Yugoslav forces located in the Košare base, forcing them to withdraw, resulting in KLA forces capturing it. The next day on 11 April Ramadani and his forces attacked the Yugoslav Army in Opljaz, where his forces managed to cut the Yugoslav line of communications, and managed to destroy one BOV armoured personnel carrier, they then continued to attack Yugoslav forces, trying to shatter the resistance of the Yugoslav soldiers. All of the attacks were unsuccessful and resulted in the Yugoslav Army inflicting heavy losses on the KLA insurgents. During the fighting in Opljaz Agim Ramadani was killed in Action after being shot by a Yugoslav sniper.

Legacy
Agim is regarded an Albanian hero. A main street in Pristina is named after him.

Notes

References

Sources

1963 births
1999 deaths
20th-century Albanian writers
Albanian nationalists in Kosovo
Kosovo Liberation Army soldiers
People from Gjilan
Albanian-language writers
Albanian male writers
Albanian expatriates in Switzerland
20th-century Albanian military personnel
Yugoslav people of Albanian descent
Albanian artists
20th-century male writers